The 2003 Seve Trophy took place 6–9 November at Campo de Golf Parador El Saler, Valencia, Spain. The team captain for Continental Europe was Seve Ballesteros, with the team captain for Great Britain and Ireland being Colin Montgomerie. The competition was won by Great Britain and Ireland.

Format 
For the first time the event was staged over four days. There were five fourball matches on both Thursday and Friday, four greensomes matches on Saturday morning, four foursomes matches on Saturday afternoon and ten singles matches on Sunday. If the score finished at 14–14, then two players from each team (but not either captain) would play a two hole play-off using the greensomes format to find the winner.

Each member of the winner team received €150,000, the losing team €70,000 each, giving a total prize fund of €2,200,000.

Teams 
Both captains played and had one wild card selection each. The remaining 8 players were the leading four players from the Official World Golf Ranking after the 2003 Telefónica Open de Madrid and the leading four players (not qualified from the World Rankings) from the Volvo Order of Merit after the 2003 Telefónica Open de Madrid.

David Howell replaced Darren Clarke who was playing in the 2003 Tour Championship which was being playing in the same week.

Source:

Day one
Thursday, 6 November 2003

Fourball

Source:

Day two
Friday, 7 November 2003

Fourball

Source:

Day three
Saturday, 8 November 2003

Morning greensomes

Source:

Afternoon foursomes

Source:

Day four
Sunday, 9 November 2003

Singles

Thomas Bjørn was injured and retired from his match. Because he withdrew less than 30 minutes before games started Paul Casey was awarded the match. If Bjørn had retired earlier the match would have been declared as halved.

Source:

References

External links
Coverage on the European Tour's official site

Seve Trophy
Golf tournaments in Spain
Seve Trophy
Seve Trophy
Seve Trophy